Vetlanda Municipality (Vetlanda kommun) is a municipality in Jönköping County, southern Sweden. The town of Vetlanda is the municipality's seat.

The municipality was created in 1971 when the City of Vetlanda (instituted in 1920) was amalgamated with the surrounding rural municipalities to form a unitary municipality. When Sweden's first local government laws went into effect in 1863, there were more than 20 entities located within the current municipality's boundaries.

Vetlanda is the birthplace of Johan Franzén, a professional ice hockey center who played for the Detroit Red Wings of the National Hockey League.

Geography
Vetlanda Municipality is the largest municipality in Jönköping County. The municipality is situated on the South Swedish highlands, an area situated some 250 meters above sea level and also includes Eksjö Municipality and Nässjö Municipality. It is a sight-worthy nature that is visited by tourists for the scenery alone.

The distance to any of the three largest Swedish cities Malmö (south-west), Gothenburg (west) and Stockholm (north-east) is rather similar; about 300 km.

Localities
There are 12 urban areas (also called a Tätort or locality) in Vetlanda Municipality.

In the table, the localities are listed according to the size of the population as of December 31, 2005. The municipal seat is in bold characters.

History
The history of Vetlanda goes back to at least the medieval age when it was the seat for the regional assembly called þing (thing). According to the imaginations of Petter Rudebeck (1660–1710), Vetlanda was before that known as Vitala, and the centre of a mythological kingdom. However, all later archeological research has failed in finding any evidence of it. But the myth was popular during the 18th and 19th century, which displays in the naming of several companies and locations around the municipality.

Sports
Vetlanda boasts successful clubs in bandy (Vetlanda BK) and in motorcycle speedway (Vetlanda Speedway).

References
Statistics Sweden

External links

Vetlanda Municipality - Official site
Coat of arms

Municipalities of Jönköping County